Burhi Gosani Devalaya (Assamese:বুঢ়ী গোসাঁনী দেৱালয় ) is a Hindu shakta temple of Goddess Durga situated at Dewal Road in Jorhat, Assam, India.

Location 
The location coordinates of the temple are 26°45'32"N 94°12'53"E

Map 
{
  "type": "FeatureCollection",
  "features": [
    {
      "type": "Feature",
      "properties": {},
      "geometry": {
        "type": "Point",
        "coordinates": [
          94.21566438701122,
          26.75873175516453
        ]
      }
    }
  ]
}

History 
The idol of the temple was brought  by Ahom king Rudra Singha from the Jaintia hills of Meghalya to the Ahom kingdom in Assam. Later  Ahom king Gaurinath Singha shifted the capital from Rangpur (Ahom capital) to Jorhat and established the Burhi Gosani Devalaya in Jorhat in the year 1794. The main event of the temple is the annual Durga Puja celebrations.

Gallery

References

External Links 

Durga temples
Jorhat district
Hindu temples in Assam
18th-century Hindu temples